The 1922 Illinois Fighting Illini football team was an American football team that represented the University of Illinois during the 1922 Big Ten Conference football season.  In their tenth season under head coach Robert Zuppke, the Illini compiled a 2–5 record and finished in sixth place in the Big Ten Conference. End David D. Wilson was the team captain.

Schedule

Awards and honors
Jim McMillen, (Guard)
All-American, Guard
Roy Miller, (Guard)
All-American, Guard

References

Illinois
Illinois Fighting Illini football seasons
Illinois Fighting Illini football